Hoblitzell is a surname that applies to the following people:
 Bruce Hoblitzell (1887–1970), mayor of Louisville, Kentucky (1957–1961)
 Fetter Schrier Hoblitzell (1838–1900), American politician from Maryland
 Frederick Hoblitzell (1890-1964), Canadian businessman and member of the House of Commons
 John D. Hoblitzell, Jr. (1912–1962), American politician from West Virginia